Heimspiel is the 2009 live album by German hip hop group Die Fantastischen Vier in celebration of their 20th anniversary as a band. It featured a crowd of 60,000 people, making this their biggest concert ever at the time.

Track listing

Disc one
"Was geht" - 7:02
"Der Picknicker" - 4:40
"Jetzt geht's ab" - 2:17
"S.M.U.D.O. Ich bin halt so" - 2:46
"Auf der Flucht" - 2:31
"Du Arsch" - 2:35
"Neues Land" - 3:13
"Mehr nehmen" - 4:43
"Pipis und Popos" - 4:55
"Sie ist weg" - 4:01

Disc two
"Ich is ich is ich is ich" - 4:54
"Le Smou" - 4:35
"Beweg deinen Popo" - 5:23
"Yeah Yeah Yeah" - 5:04
"Spiesser" - 3:01
"Krieger" - 7:34
"Schizophren" - 5:16
"Sommerregen" - 5:57
"Fornika" - 6:24
"MfG" - 3:58

Disc three
"Liebesbrief" - 6:38
"Bring It Back" - 3:16
"Troy" - 6:35
"Die da" - 5:35
"Einfach sein" - 4:10
"Tag am Meer" - 6:53
"Ernten was wir säen" - 7:16
"Populär" - 4:32

References

Die Fantastischen Vier albums
2009 albums